Franklin Deland Purnell (April 5, 1933 – April 19, 2007) was an American football player and coach.  He played professionally as a fullback in the National Football League (NFL) with the Green Bay Packers during the 1957 NFL season. Purnell served as the head football coach at his alma mater, Alcorn Agricultural and Mechanical College—now known as Alcorn State University—from 1960 to 1963, compiling a record of 14–20.

Head coaching record

References

External links
 

1933 births
2007 deaths
American football fullbacks
Alcorn State Braves football coaches
Alcorn State Braves football players
Green Bay Packers players
People from Montgomery County, Mississippi
Coaches of American football from Mississippi
Players of American football from Mississippi
African-American coaches of American football
African-American players of American football
20th-century African-American sportspeople
21st-century African-American sportspeople